Santiago Martín Hondo Ndongo (born 4 October 1974), known as Santi, is an Equatorial Guinean former footballer who played as a centre-back for lower division clubs in the Community of Madrid, Spain and for the Equatorial Guinea national team.

Early life
Santi was born in Libreville, Gabon to Equatoguinean Fang parents and have migrated to Spain after a while.

Club career
Santi has played for CD Cobeña and AD Torrejón CF in Spain.

International career
Santi represented Equatorial Guinea in both legs against Togo for the 2006 World Cup Preliminaries. He was also part of the Equatoguinean team in the Mundialito de la Inmigración y la Solidaridad 2010 in Madrid, Spain.

Career statistics

References

External links

1974 births
Living people
Sportspeople from Libreville
Citizens of Equatorial Guinea through descent
Equatoguinean footballers
Association football central defenders
Equatorial Guinea international footballers
Equatoguinean emigrants to Spain
Naturalised citizens of Spain
Spanish footballers
CD Cobeña players
Tercera División players
Divisiones Regionales de Fútbol players
Spanish sportspeople of Equatoguinean descent